Christoph Ferdinand Heinrich Pröhle (June 4, 1822 – May 28, 1895) was a German literary historian, teacher (Oberlehrer), writer and folk tale and fairy tale collector (a successor to the Brothers Grimm).

Disambiguation of Heinrich
The given name "Heinrich" occurs in several cases among the relatives of the writer in question. As far as it is known, all the Pröhle are relatives, whether the family name is written with short Germanic umlaut or long Hungarian umlaut.

 Heinrich Andreas Pröhle (1797–1875), Lutheran pastor and poet in Hornhausen, Germany, the father of the writer
 Christoph Ferdinand Heinrich Pröhle (1822–1895), the writer
 Heinrich Prőhle (1870–1950), a well known pastor and theological professor of the Hungarian Lutherans in Pozsony (Preßburg or Bratislava) in Austria-Hungary, a cousin of the writer
 Heinrich Prőhle (?–?), director of a factory in Mosonmagyaróvár, later a special translator in Budapest, Hungary, the son of the pastor in Pozsony above
 Heinrich Prőhle (b. 1936), a professor at the Liszt Ferenc Academy of Music in Budapest, Hungary, the son of the translator above

Life and career
1822: Heinrich Pröhle was born in Satuelle (then in Neuhaldensleben, Ohrekreis, German Confederation) as the son of the Lutheran pastor and hobby poet Heinrich Andreas Pröhle.
1843−1846: he studied history and German philology in Halle (1843–1845) and Berlin (1845/46).
1847/48: study tour in Southern Germany, Hungary, Upper Austria and Tyrol.
1848/49: political correspondent of the newspaper "Augsburgische Allgemeine Zeitung" in Wien.
1849: an early book, "Aus dem Kaiserstaat" (Wien).
1849−: independent writer in Berlin.
1851−: series of extended tale and legend collection tours in Harz.
1854−1857: his residence is moved to Wernigerode, close to the peak Brocken, a convenient base for the collection tours in Harz.
1855: Wilhelm Grimm and Karl Joseph Simrock promoted Heinrich Pröhle in Bonn (Friedrich Christoph Dahlmann was teaching there at the time), for his work on Brockensagen and the etymology of the names in Harz ("De Bructeri nominibus et de fabulis, quae ad eum montem pertinent").
1857–1890: teacher at a realschule in Berlin, 1858/59 in Mülheim at Ruhr.
1890: title "professor" was given at his retirement.
1895: he died in Steglitz near Berlin.

Intellectual heritage
He became well known as a collector and publisher of German folk-tales and folk-legends. He was a German literary historian as well.

His intellectual heritage was recognised in several ways:
 he received the title "professor" at his retirement
 there is a street called Pröhleweg in Berlin-Spandau (very close to Potsdam), since 1 July 1964.

Bibliography
 Berlin und Wien. Berlin 1850
 Der Pfarrer von Grünrode. Leipzig 1852
 Kinder- und Volksmärchen. Leipzig 1853, (collected about Oberharz mainly)
 Märchen für die jugend. Halle 1854
 Harzsagen. 1. Band, Leipzig 1853, 2. Band 1856
 Harzbilder. Sitten und Gebräuche aus dem Harzgebirge. Leipzig 1855
 Unterharzische Sagen. Aschersleben 1856
 Rheinlands schönste Sagen und Geschichten. 1886
 Harzsagen. Bad Harzburg 1957

Explanatory notes

References

External links
 Heinrich Pröhle in the catalogue of the German National Library (note: see the disambiguation of the diverse Heinrichs in the family above)
 Heinrich Pröhle at zeno.org (the greatest German digital library)
 
 

1822 births
1895 deaths
19th-century German educators
People from the Province of Saxony
University of Halle alumni
Humboldt University of Berlin alumni
German male writers